SALC or Salc may refer to:

 Salč, a settlement in Ulcinj Municipality, Montenegro
South Andhra Lutheran Church, Christian denomination in India 
 South Australian Land Company,  formed before British colonisation of South Australia
 South Australian Legislative Council, one of the two chambers of the Parliament of South Australia
 Southern Africa Litigation Centre, litigant in Southern Africa Litigation Centre v National Director of Public Prosecutions
 Symmetry-adapted linear combination (disambiguation)

See also 
 Salk (disambiguation)